The birth of the first white child is a concept that marks the establishment of a European colony in the New World, especially in the historiography of the United States.

Americas

Canada

Jonathan Guy, the son of Newfoundland settler Nicholas Guy, was the first child born to English parents in Canada, and one of the first born in any part of North America within a permanent settlement. He was born on 27 March 1613 in Cuper's Cove, a settlement that has been continuously occupied since 1610 and where his family remained long after his birth.

Hélène Desportes is often cited as the first white child born in New France. She was probably born in 1620, to Pierre Desportes and Françoise Langlois, although there is some disagreement about whether she had actually been born in France before her family's arrival in the colony in 1614.  Hélène's first cousin Eustache Martin was born in October 1621 in Quebec to Abraham Martin and Marguerite Langlois.

At Port Royal, Acadia in 1636, Pierre Martin and Catherine Vigneau, who had arrived on the passenger ship Saint Jehan along with 78 other migrants, were the first European parents to have a child in Acadia. The first-born child was Mathieu Martin. In part because of this distinction, Mathieu Martin later became the Seigneur of Cobequid (1699).

Mexico

The first white child in modern Mexico was likely born in the 1520’s.

Earlier, Gonzalo Guerrero, a sailor from Palos, Spain, is presumed to have reached the New World aboard a Spanish expedition in the late 15th or early 16th century, which was shipwrecked along the Yucatán Peninsula. Around 1511, Guerrero became a war chief for Nachan Kaan, Lord of Chektumal, and married a rich Maya woman, with whom he fathered the first half-European children of Mexico. Guerrero and his wife's three children are widely deemed the first mestizos of the New World.

United States

Martín de Argüelles, Jr., born in the Spanish colony of St. Augustine, Spanish Florida, was the first child of European descent known to be born in what is now the continental United States. Born in 1566, his father was a hidalgo and one of the expeditioners who went to New Spain (modern Mexico) with Captain General Pedro Menéndez de Avilés in 1565. St. Augustine, Florida, is also the oldest continuously occupied European-founded city anywhere in the United States excluding Puerto Rico.

Virginia Dare, born in 1587 at the Roanoke Colony, was the first child born in North America to English parents, and her memory was celebrated in the British colonies.  Peregrine White, born aboard the Mayflower at Provincetown Harbor in 1620, was the first Pilgrim birth.

Sarah Rapelje, born on June 6, 1625, was the first white child born in New Netherland.

The first English-descended child born in Spanish Texas was Helena Dill Berryman, born in 1804 in what is now Nacogdoches County.

Oceania 

Seebaer van Nieuwelant (born 27 July 1623), son of Willemtgen and Willem Janszoon, was born south of Dirk Hartog Island, in present-day Western Australia. His father, not to be confused with the earlier Dutch explorer of the same name, was a midshipman from Amsterdam. He and his wife were aboard the Leijden, commanded by Claes Hermanszoon, which was charting the coast at the time. Their son's name in Dutch meant "sea-born of new land".

The first European birth in New Zealand was Thomas Holloway King at the Rangihoua Bay settlement on 21 February 1815. The first child born to European parents in Fiji was Augusta Cameron, born 5 December 1835.

Africa

Rhodesia

Nada Burnham (1894–1896), daughter of the celebrated American scout Frederick Russell Burnham, was the first white child born in Bulawayo and died of fever and starvation during the Siege of Bulawayo in the Second Matabele War. She was buried in the Pioneer Cemetery in Bulawayo, Southern Rhodesia.

Notes

References

Further reading
Mollie, Gillen. 1989. A Biographical Dictionary of the First Fleet. 

European colonization of the Americas
History of immigration to Australia
White Americans
First things
Historiography of the United States